Ioanna Tantcheva (born ) is a Bulgarian group rhythmic gymnast. She represents her nation at international competitions.

She participated at the 2008 Summer Olympics in Beijing. She also competed at world championships, including at the 2007 World Rhythmic Gymnastics Championships.

References

External links

https://database.fig-gymnastics.com/public/gymnasts/biography/2619/true?backUrl=%2Fpublic%2Fresults%2Fdisplay%2F544%3FidAgeCategory%3D8%26idCategory%3D78%23anchor_41797
http://www.bestsports.com.br/db/atlpag.php?atl=17326&lang=2
http://www.gettyimages.com/detail/news-photo/bulgarias-national-team-composed-by-tzveta-kousseva-yolita-news-photo/81488091#bulgarias-national-team-composed-by-tzveta-kousseva-yolita-manolova-picture-id81488091
HighBeam

1989 births
Living people
Bulgarian rhythmic gymnasts
Place of birth missing (living people)
Gymnasts at the 2008 Summer Olympics
Olympic gymnasts of Bulgaria
Medalists at the Rhythmic Gymnastics World Championships
Medalists at the Rhythmic Gymnastics European Championships